Wang Zhengpu (born August 1963) is a Chinese politician who is the current governor of Hebei, in office since 21 October 2021. Previously he served as director of the National Administration for Rural Revitalization.

He was a delegate to the 12th National People's Congress and is a representative of the 19th National Congress of the Chinese Communist Party

Biography
Wang was born in Yantai, Shandong, in August 1963. In 1983, he enrolled in Beijing Agricultural University (now China Agricultural University), majoring in agricultural economic management, where he graduated in 1987.

Wang joined the Chinese Communist Party (CCP) in April 1987, and was despatched to the Ministry of Agriculture in July 1987, where he worked his way from an ordinary official to the position of Director of Finance Division over a period of 21 years.

In October 2010, he was transferred to northeast China's Liaoning province and appointed acting mayor and deputy party secretary of Liaoyang, and then party secretary, the top political position in the city, beginning in September 2014. In October 2015, he became deputy head of the Organization Department of the CCP Liaoning Provincial Committee, rising to head the next year. He became a member of the Standing Committee of the CCP Liaoning Provincial Committee in October 2016 before being assigned to the similar position in southwest China's Sichuan province in August 2018.

On 25 February 2021, he took office as director of the newly founded National Administration for Rural Revitalization, but having held the position for only half a year.

On 19 October 2021, he was promoted to deputy party secretary of Hebei, replacing Xu Qin, who was appointed party secretary of Heilongjiang. on October 21, he was made acting governor of Hebei.

He was awarded the Silver Olympic Order after the 2022 Winter Olympics.

References

1963 births
Living people
People from Yantai
China Agricultural University alumni
People's Republic of China politicians from Shandong
Chinese Communist Party politicians from Shandong
Mayors of Liaoyang
Delegates to the 12th National People's Congress
Recipients of the Olympic Order